The United States Army Human Resources Command (Army HRC or simply HRC) is a command of the United States Army. 
HRC is a direct reporting unit (DRU) supervised by the Office of the Deputy Chief of Staff for Personnel (DCS), G-1, focused on improving the career management potential of Army Soldiers. 

From basic training through retirement, Regular Army and United States Army Reserve Soldiers have one agency to assist in career management.

HRC is located on Fort Knox, Kentucky, and includes 40 operational elements around the country under the leadership of the HRC commander. HRC is the functional proponent for military personnel management (except for the Judge Advocate General's Corps and the Chaplain Corps). HRC also supports the Director, United States Army National Guard, and the Chief, Army Reserve, in their management of the Selected Reserve.

The HRC commander is also the commander of the Individual Ready Reserve (IRR), the Standby Reserve, and the Retired Reserve.

History
HRC was established in 2003 from the merger of the United States Total Army Personnel Command (PERSCOM) in Alexandria, Virginia and the United States Army Reserve Personnel Command (AR-PERSCOM) in St. Louis, Missouri. PERSCOM and AR-PERSCOM were inactivated 1 October 2003. HRC was a field operating agency of the DCS, G-1 prior to December 2017.

HRC came under the Department of Defense 2005 Base Realignment and Closure (BRAC) Commission. Recommendations were put forth to create the Human Resources Center of Excellence, and HRC was directed to move its elements in Alexandria, Virginia, Indianapolis, Indiana, and St. Louis, Missouri to a new facility at Fort Knox, Kentucky, by 2011.

The HRC complex was named and dedicated in honor of Lieutenant General Timothy J. Maude, who perished on September 11th, 2001, in the attack on the Pentagon. At his time of death, Maude was serving as the United States Army Deputy Chief of Staff for Personnel, G-1. The complex is the largest single building project in the history of Fort Knox, totaling . It is a three-story, six-winged, red-brick facility.

List of commanding generals

References

External links
 Army Human Resources Command—Website
 Army Human Resources Command—Website

Military units and formations established in 2003
Human Resources Command
Fort Knox
Military human resource management